ESSA-6 (or TOS-D) was a spin-stabilized operational meteorological satellite. Its name was derived from that of its oversight agency, the Environmental Science Services Administration (ESSA).

Launch 
ESSA-6 was launched on November 10, 1967, at 18:00 UTC. It was launched atop a Delta rocket from Vandenberg Air Force Base, California, USA. ESSA-6 had an inclination of 102.12°, and an orbited the earth once every 114.8 minutes.

References

Spacecraft launched in 1967
Weather satellites of the United States